Vakhromeyevo is a rural locality (a selo) in Mayachninsky Selsoviet of Ikryaninsky District, Astrakhan Oblast, Russia. The population was 150 as of 2010. There are 5 streets.

Geography 
Vakhromeyevo is located 45 km south of Ikryanoye (the district's administrative centre) by road. Khmelevoy is the nearest rural locality.

References 

Rural localities in Ikryaninsky District